Poltavsky (masculine), Poltavskaya (feminine), or Poltavskoye (neuter) may refer to:
Poltavsky District, a district of Omsk Oblast, Russia
Poltavskyi Raion, a district of Poltava Oblast, Ukraine
Poltavsky (rural locality) (Poltavskaya, Poltavskoye), name of several rural localities in Russia
Poltava Oblast (Poltavska oblast), an oblast in Ukraine